Ctenosaura clarki, commonly known as the Balsas armed lizard, Balsas spiny-tailed iguana, Michoacán dwarf spiny-tailed iguana, or nopiche, is a species of lizard in the family Iguanidae. The species native to Mexico.

Etymology
The specific name, clarki, is in honor of Dr. Herbert Charles Clark (1877-1960), director of medical research and laboratories, United Fruit Co., for his support of the herpetological collection of the Museum of Comparative Zoology, Harvard University.

Geographic range
C. clarki is endemic to the Balsas dry forests in the state of Michoacán in western Mexico.

Behavior
A semi-arboreal species, C. clarki shelters in hollow branches of tree cacti.

Reproduction
C. clarki is oviparous.

Conservation status
C. clarki is threatened by habitat loss.

References

Further reading
Bailey, John Wendell (1928). "A revision of the lizards of the genus Ctenosaura". Proceedings of the United States National Museum 73: 1-55. (Ctenosaura clarki, new species, pp. 44–46 + plate 27).
Gicca, Diderot F. (1982). "Enyaliosaurus clarki (Bailey) Balsas Armed Lizard". Catalogue of American Amphibians and Reptiles (301): 1–2.

Ctenosaura
Endemic reptiles of Mexico
Reptiles described in 1928
Taxonomy articles created by Polbot
Balsas dry forests